Karl Cachoeira Della Vedova Júnior (born 7 April 1993) is a Brazilian footballer who plays as a midfielder for Santa Cruz.

References

External links

Karl at ZeroZero

1993 births
Living people
Brazilian footballers
Association football midfielders
Sociedade Esportiva e Recreativa Caxias do Sul players
F.C. Arouca players
C.D. Tondela players
Esporte Clube São Luiz players
Esporte Clube São José players
Clube Esportivo Aimoré players
Brusque Futebol Clube players
Associação Desportiva São Caetano players
Campeonato Brasileiro Série D players
Associação Ferroviária de Esportes players
Primeira Liga players
Brazilian expatriate footballers
Brazilian expatriate sportspeople in Portugal
Expatriate footballers in Portugal